Beatriz Teresa Missiego Campos (born 16 January 1938 in Lima, Peru) better known as Betty Missiego is a Peruvian singer, who has held dual Spanish citizenship since 1972 and lives in Spain.

In her native Peru, Betty began her career as a dancer, but she was forced to abandon professional dancing due to an injury. She continued pursuing a career in show business and was a host for a television program that brought her great popularity in her native country.

In 1969, she moved to Spain to pursue a singing career, where she received Spanish citizenship in 1972. She currently holds dual citizenship in both Spain and Peru.

In 1972, she represented Peru in the first Festival OTI de la Canción, held in the Auditorio del Palacio de Congresos y Exposiciones in Madrid (Spain) on 25 November, with the song "Recuerdos de un adiós".

She represented Spain at the Eurovision Song Contest 1979 held in Jerusalem with the song "Su canción". Betty was accompanied by four children (Javier Glaria, Alexis Carmona, Beatriz Carmona, and Rosalía Rodríguez) who sang 157 LAs in the song, a Eurovision record. At the end of the song, each children unfurled a small banner, with "thanks" inscribed on each in English, Spanish, Hebrew and French, respectively. Betty ended up in 2nd place with 116 points, behind Israel's Milk and Honey with the song "Hallelujah". She also participated in the World Popular Festival in Tokyo and the Music Olympics in Paris. In 1980 she submitted another song, "Don José" to the Spanish selection committee for Eurovision but it did not make it to the finals in The Hague.

Betty's son Joaquín Missiego (known by his mononym "Missiego"), became a successful singer.

References

1938 births
Eurovision Song Contest entrants for Spain
Eurovision Song Contest entrants of 1979
Living people
20th-century Peruvian women singers
20th-century Peruvian singers
Singers from Lima
Spanish women singers
Peruvian emigrants to Spain